Canadian International School of Guangzhou (CIS-GZ) is a Canadian international school (for children of foreign workers) in Panyu District, Guangzhou, Guangdong, China. Its levels are early childhood through grade 12. CIS-GZ the curriculum of Alberta, Canada.

Its current campus has 150 dormitories, and can accommodate up to 1,000 students.

Student body
The school admits students with foreign, Hong Kong, Macau, and Republic of China (Taiwan) passports. The following neighborhoods frequently send students to CIS-GZ: Agile, Cambridge Shire, Clifford, Global Villas, Merchant Hill, South China Country Garden, and Star River Phase.

References

External links

 Canadian International School of Guangzhou
 Canadian International School of Guangzhou 

International schools in Guangzhou
Guangzhou
Boarding schools in China
Private schools in Guangdong